Straight Outta Oz is the second solo studio album and original musical, written and produced by American singer-songwriter and YouTube celebrity Todrick Hall with music produced by Jeeve Ducornet and wiidope, released on 23 June 2016. Featured artists include Nicole Scherzinger, Jordin Sparks, Perez Hilton, Joseph Gordon-Levitt, Amber Riley, Raven Symoné and Tamar Braxton. It is based on the Wizard of Oz whilst being a semi-autobiographical account of his rise to fame in Los Angeles (Oz).

Music videos
The trailer for the album was first released on May 13, 2016. Todrick has released the musical in the form of an hour long piece (as well as each song separately) on his YouTube channel. On April 27, 2017 the song "Defying Gravity" was released as a music video and digital download. The song does not appear on either the standard or deluxe versions of the album but does appear in the tour.

Track listing

Deluxe Edition
On March 21, 2017, Hall released a deluxe version of the visual album on YouTube as well as iTunes, featuring 4 songs from the Straight Outta Oz Tour that were not present on the album, as well as re-recorded versions of other songs. This album also included the song "Blah Blah Blah" present in the original version of the video, but not on the original album. It also includes a remix of Todrick's previous 2015 single "Low" with new vocals from RuPaul.

Behind the Curtain
Behind the Curtain, a documentary film about the making of Straight Outta Oz, was released in select theaters on December 6 and 13, 2017. It was released for digital download and on Netflix on December 12. A trailer for it was played prior to the opening of Hall's concerts in 2017.

Tour
To promote the album, Hall launched the Straight Outta Oz Tour for summer 2016. Originally a 30-date tour taking place in North America, starting in Vancouver, Canada, on July 7, 2016. On February 18, 2017, additional dates in the United States, Australia, and Europe were announced; the tour would officially conclude in Melbourne, Australia, on June 5, 2017. During sho

Set list
The following set list is obtained from the July 13, 2016, show in Beverly Hills, California. It is not intended to represent all dates throughout the tour.

"Dance Rehearsal" 
"No Place Like Home"
"Meet the Divas" 
"Black and White"
"His Eye Is on the Sparrow" 
"Proud"
"Over the Rainbow"
"Color"
"Round and Round" / "Verified"
"Little People"
"Expensive"
"Monkey Airlines" 
"Whoop That Ass"
"Dumb"
"If I Had a Heart"
"Lyin' to Myself"
"Lions and Tigers and Bears" 
"Papi"
"Green"
"What Do Ya Say?"
"Flying Monkey" 
"See Your Face"
"Low"
"Wrong Bitch"
"Defying Gravity" 
"Water Guns"
"Blah Blah Blah"
"Home"
"Splits on Trees" / "Twerkin' in the Rain" / "Weave Girls"
"4 Beyoncé" 
Encore
"Haterz"

Notes
For 2017 shows, "90's Disney", a megamix consisting of several Disney songs from the 1990's, was added to the set list.

Tour dates

Notes

References

2010s musical films
2016 albums
Todrick Hall albums
Concept albums
LGBT-related albums
Visual albums